Žirany is a village and municipality in the Nitra District in western central Slovakia, in the Nitra Region.

History
In historical records the village was first mentioned in 1113.

Geography
The village lies at an altitude of 250 metres and covers an area of 15.558 km². It has a population 1.355 people (cenzus 2011).

Ethnicity
The population is 639 (47%) Magyar, 579 (43%) Slovak and 137 (10%) others.

Sister cities
  - Dorog, Hungary

External links
 
http://www.statistics.sk/mosmis/eng/run.html

Villages and municipalities in Nitra District
Hungarian communities in Slovakia